Tiputini Airport  is an airport serving the Napo River village of Tiputini in Orellana Province, Ecuador.

The Tiputini non-directional beacon (ident: TPU) is on the field.

See also

List of airports in Ecuador
Transport in Ecuador

References

External links
 HERE Maps - Tiputini
 OpenStreetMap - Tiputini
 OurAirports - Tiputini
 Tiputini

Airports in Ecuador